The Battle for the Gold Pan (also called The DU/CC Rivalry, or known locally as The Gold Pan) is a series played between the Colorado College Tigers and the University of Denver Pioneers hockey teams. 

The Gold Pan is among the top rivalries in American college ice hockey. With over 300 games played, only Michigan and Michigan State have more games played among top rivalries, which also include the Green Line Rivalry, between Boston University and Boston College and the Border Battle, between the Minnesota and the Wisconsin.

Background 

The University of Denver and Colorado College hockey teams began playing one another in 1949–50, the first season for the University of Denver men's team. Colorado College has had a hockey program since 1938. The two schools were charter members of the Western Collegiate Hockey Association (WCHA), which was founded in 1951. The schools are also charter and current members of the National Collegiate Hockey Conference (NCHC), founded in 2011 with play starting in the 2013–14 season.

Both colleges are private schools with small student populations on Colorado's Front Range. Colorado College (enrollment near 2,000 students) is located in Colorado Springs, while the University of Denver (undergraduate enrollment near 6,000 students) is located in Denver. The two campuses are only 65 miles apart, right off of I-25. As of the 2022–23 season, home ice for the Colorado College Tigers is Ed Robson Arena, sitting at 6,060 feet above sea level, while the home ice for the Denver Pioneers is Magness Arena, at 5,370 feet, with both arenas featuring NHL-size rinks. Previously, CC had played at the Broadmoor World Arena, which has a larger, Olympic-size rink and sits at 6,250 feet. Nearly 300 NHL and other professional hockey players have passed through the hockey programs of the schools.

Both schools have produced Hobey Baker Award winners. Colorado College has had two Hobey Baker winners, Peter Sejna (2003) and Marty Sertich (2005). The University of Denver has had two Hobey Baker Award winners also, Matt Carle (2006) and Will Butcher (2017). Both Colorado College and the University of Denver have eight players who were finalists for the Hobey Baker Award since its inception in 1981; as of the end of the 2017/18 Season.

Plans for Robson Arena, estimated to cost $38 million, were first announced in 2018. The arena namesake is Colorado College 1954 alum and former CC Tiger hockey player Edward Robson. The new arena has a capacity of about 3,400, less than half that of The Broadmoor World Arena. The new arena also features an NHL-sized rink, removing a distinct difference between the schools' venues. Robson Arena will sit near 6,050 feet above sea level, roughly 200 feet below the Broadmoor World Arena. Colorado College planned to break ground for the new arena in 2018, initially hoping for it to be ready for play by 2020.  Changes made during the planning process, most notably the addition of a parking garage and a shift in the arena footprint within its city block, led to delays. While demolition on the project began in 2018, groundbreaking for the new arena took place in 2020, with a planned opening for the 2021–22 season.

The Gold Pan format is as follows: Four games are played every regular season between Colorado College and the University of Denver, both schools playing two home games and two away games. The games are played on two separate weekends series in the regular season. One series is played near the beginning of the regular season, and the other series near the end of the regular season. The series are played in a Home & Home Series, where both teams play on their home ice once per series (unlike most college weekends series, which play at only one team's home ice). The team with the better record out of the four games is able to claim the Gold Pan, till next year. If a season series is tied, than the defender of the Gold Pan retains the coveted trophy for another year. With the NCHC ruling, if after an overtime period a game remains tied, both schools will continue to play in a tiebreaker until a winner is declared. A game that goes to a tiebreaker is still counted as a draw in the overall record and Gold Pan record, the tiebreaker is merely to see who is given a bonus point in NCHC standings. Post-season matches are not counted for the Gold Pan, but are counted overall in the rivalry.

History 
The two schools first met in January 1950 and have faced off against one another at least four times every year since then, as well as multiple playoff matches. There have been a few games postponed or even canceled due to violence between fans and players back between the 1960s thru the 1980s. Up until the 1990s, there was no formal series trophy for the season series, as the CC/DU games were merely for "bragging rights". In the 1993/94 season, then-DU coach Frank Serratore and CC coach Don Lucia decided to create a traveling trophy for the season series winner between the schools. That first Gold Pan trophy was a rusty old gold pan from Cripple Creek, Colorado that had actually been used for prospecting. That first trophy was lost in Denver after the 2003–2004 season. The current trophy was created by Colorado sculptor Mike Halterman and donated by the Cripple Creek & Victor Gold Mine in 2005.

In 2011 with the NCAA realignment of college hockey conferences, Colorado College and the University of Denver joined together to create the NCHC, bringing the rivalry with them. The first season in the NCHC (2013/14 season) led to the conference rule of a shootout if a game is tied after overtime. On November 8, 2013, CC and DU played the first ever regular season shootout in college hockey in Colorado Springs. CC and DU played to a 1–1 tie after overtime, DU would win in the shootout 2–0.

On February 20, 2016, the teams faced off for their first outdoor match, at Coors Field in Denver, billed as the "Battle on Blake" in reference to the location of Coors Field at the corner of Blake Street and 20th Street. Denver won the match 4–1 in front of 35,144 spectators.

Game results
 

  † – denotes Conference Playoff match 
  ^ – denotes NCAA Playoff match
  ø – denotes Outdoor match

Goal Count

as of January 2, 2021

Head-to-head tally

As of January 2, 2021

Decade Game tally

As of January 2, 2021

Weekday Game tally

As of January 2, 2021

Team tallies (side by side)
NCAA National Titles- DU leads 8–2 (National Title Appearances: DU leads 11 – 5)
NCAA Frozen Four Appearances- DU leads 17–10
Hobey Baker Award Winners- Tied 2–2 (Finalists- Tied leads 8–8)
WCHA MacNaughton Cup Regular Season Titles- DU leads 15–10 (No Longer Contested)
WCHA Broadmoor Trophy Playoff Titles- DU leads 15–1 (No Longer Contested)
NCHC Penrose Memorial Cup Regular Season Titles-DU leads 1–0 (**)
NCHC Frozen Faceoff Playoff Titles- DU leads 2–0
Stats as of the end of the 2019/20 Season

See also
Battle for Pikes Peak
 College rivalry
 Beanpot (ice hockey)
Green Line Rivalry
Michigan–Michigan State ice hockey rivalry

References

College ice hockey rivalries in the United States
Colorado College Tigers men's ice hockey
Denver Pioneers ice hockey
1950 establishments in Colorado